Wulong District is a district of Chongqing Municipality, China, bordering Guizhou province to the south.

Administration

Climate

Education

There is a central elementary school in Baiyun Town.

Transportation
The district is served by Chongqing Xiannüshan Airport which opened in December 2020.

World Heritage Site
Numerous Wulong Karst limestone rock formations are scenic landmarks in Wulong. They are protected within the UNESCO South China Karst World Heritage Site.

Features
Three Natural Bridges — in Xiannüshan Town.
Furong Cave —on the Furong River.
Er Wang Dong — in Houping Miao and Tuzi Ethnic Township.

References

External links

Districts of Chongqing